Osawatomie is a city in Miami County, Kansas, United States,  southwest of Kansas City.  As of the 2020 census, the population of the city was 4,255.  It derives its name as a portmanteau of two nearby streams, the Marais des Cygnes River (formerly named "Osage River") and Pottawatomie Creek.

History

Osawatomie's name is a compound of two primary Native American tribes from the area, the Osage and Pottawatomie. The town is bordered by Pottawatomie Creek and the Marais des Cygnes River (part of the Osage River system), which are also named for the two tribes.

The Emigrant Aid Society's transport of settlers to the Kansas Territory as a base for Free State forces was key in the establishment of the community of Osawatomie in October 1854. Settled by abolitionists in hope of aiding Kansas's entry to the United States as a free state, the community of Osawatomie and pro-slavery communities nearby were quickly engaged in violence.

In March 1855, abolitionists Reverend Samuel Adair and his wife Florella settled in a cabin near Osawatomie to serve as missionaries to the community. Florella's half-brother, John Brown came to Bleeding Kansas later the same year with a wagon of guns in order to help fight the pro slavery forces like his five sons, who were already living in another community in the area. Brown then came to Osawatomie to visit the Adairs and fight pro-slavery forces there. By 1856, having established himself as a leader of free state guerillas, Brown made Osawatomie and the Adair cabin his base. In a raid in May 1856, Brown killed five pro-slavery men along Pottawatomie Creek near the current town of Lane, Kansas. This was then referred to as the "Pottawatomie massacre", which inflamed the fighting throughout the Kansas Territory. The second and main Battle of Osawatomie took place on August 30, 1856. Osawatomie played a key role throughout the Civil War, serving as a center for Jayhawker activity.

By 1857, Osawatomie had grown to a town of 800 and in 1859 hosted the first convention of the Kansas Republican Party. In recognition for Osawatomie's part in ensuring Kansas remained a free state, the Kansas Legislature established the Osawatomie State Mental Hospital in 1863, the first mental hospital west of the Mississippi River. It admitted its first patient in 1866, and is still operational. By 1879, a railroad was built to serve Osawatomie, aiding its growth into a supply town and a main shipping point. As a result, Osawatomie grew to a population of 4,046 by 1910. Osawatomie was a division point for the Missouri Pacific Railroad and the Union Pacific Railroad from 1879 to 1985.

Osawatomie was chartered in 1883 and in 1890 became a second-class city. The commission form of government was adopted in 1914.

Battle of Osawatomie

The first skirmish in Osawatomie took place on June 7, 1856. However, there was not much of a fight, and no blood was shed. The town's buildings were plundered, and some horses were taken. The larger, and main conflict known as the Battle of Osawatomie began August 30, 1856 as John Brown was camped just north Osawatomie and looking east for pro-slavery forces. A pro-slavery force of 250, led by John William Reid, came riding into Osawatomie from another direction. One of John Brown's sons Frederick Brown was walking to the Adair cabin at the time, and was shot. When Reverend Adair heard the shot, he sent his own son to warn and notify John Brown of the raid. Brown and 31 of the free state guerillas took positions to attempt to defend Osawatomie. Heavy gunfire took place for over 45 minutes, until Brown and his men ran out of ammunition. They retreated hoping they would be chased, and the community of Osawatomie would be left alone. However, despite the attempts of Brown to get Reid's men to follow, they instead looted and burned Osawatomie. Only three buildings remained standing when it was over.

Presidential visits

On August 31, 1910, President Theodore Roosevelt gave his famous New Nationalism speech in Osawatomie. The central issue he argued was government protection of human welfare and property rights.

On December 6, 2011, President Barack Obama gave an economic speech reprising many of Roosevelt's themes at Osawatomie High School.

Geography
Osawatomie is located at  (38.501650, -94.950799), along the Marais des Cygnes River.

Climate
The climate in this area is characterized by hot, humid summers and generally mild to cool dry winters. According to the Köppen Climate Classification system, Osawatomie has a humid subtropical climate, abbreviated "Cfa" on climate maps.

Demographics

Osawatomie is part of the Kansas City metropolitan area.

2010 census
As of the census of 2010, there were 4,447 people, 1,644 households, and 1,075 families residing in the city. The racial makeup of the city was 92.3% White, 3.1% African American, 1.0% Native American, 0.3% Asian, 0.9% from other races, and 2.4% from two or more races. Hispanic or Latino of any race were 2.9% of the population.

There were 1,644 households, of which 39.1% had children under the age of 18 living with them, 42.9% were married couples living together, 16.2% had a female householder with no husband present, 6.2% had a male householder with no wife present, and 34.6% were non-families. 29.7% of all households were made up of individuals, and 12.9% had someone living alone who was 65 years of age or older. The average household size was 2.53 and the average family size was 3.09.

The median age in the city was 34.6 years. 28.6% of residents were under the age of 18; 8.5% were between the ages of 18 and 24; 25.9% were from 25 to 44; 24% were from 45 to 64; and 13% were 65 years of age or older. The gender makeup of the city was 48.0% male and 52.0% female.

2000 census
As of the census of 2000, there were 4,645 people, 1,781 households, and 1,130 families residing in the city. The racial makeup of the city was 92.21% White, 4.16% African American, 0.47% Native American, 0.22% Asian, 0.04% Pacific Islander, 0.75% from other races, and 2.15% from two or more races. Hispanic or Latino of any race were 2.54% of the population.

There were 1,781 households, out of which 34.7% had children under the age of 18 living with them, 44.9% were married couples living together, 13.3% had a female householder with no husband present, and 36.5% were non-families. 31.6% of all households were made up of individuals, and 14.1% had someone living alone who was 65 years of age or older. The average household size was 2.42 and the average family size was 3.03.

In the city, the population was spread out, with 27.2% under the age of 18, 9.9% from 18 to 24, 30.0% from 25 to 44, 18.6% from 45 to 64, and 14.3% who were 65 years of age or older. The median age was 34 years. For every 100 females, there were 90.6 males. For every 100 females age 18 and over, there were 91.9 males.

The median income for a household in the city was $29,104, and the median income for a family was $37,172. Males had a median income of $30,650 versus $23,043 for females. The per capita income for the city was $15,353. About 10.9% of families and 12.9% of the population were below the poverty line, including 16.5% of those under age 18 and 10.6% of those age 65 or over.

Historical places

Osawatomie has several historical places, 5 of which are listed on the National Historic Register.
 The Mills House - A . Queen-Anne style home built in 1902 for William Mills.
 Asylum Bridge - An unusual bridge built in 1906 connecting the community to the state mental hospital.
 Creamery Bridge - In 1930, this bridge was built crossing the Marais des Cygnes River. Another just like it crosses the Pottawatomie Creek. Osawatomie is between the two. Both bridges are on the National Historic Register.
 John Brown Museum State Historic Site: The site of the Battle of Osawatomie is contained in the John Brown Memorial Park. Also, the Adair Cabin is exhibited there. 
 John Brown Lookout - Located north of 319th and Lookout Road, this high point in the county was used as a Civil War lookout. There is now a ladder there that can be used to cross the fence line for access to the lookout. An exhibit at John Brown State Historic site also features John Brown Lookout.

Other historic places in or around Osawatomie include:
 Midway Drive-In Theater - Located off of Old KC Road between Paola and Osawatomie is a drive-in theater, one of only twelve remaining in the state. This outdoor movie theater is still operational and shows movies, which used to be called "talkies", during the spring and summer months.
 Flood Marker - An historic flood of the Marais des Cygnes River occurred in 1951. A marker was placed north of 343rd and one-half mile east of Columbia Rd to show the height of the water, 50.3 feet, which has yet to be matched.

Community

The community of Osawatomie offers a museum and driving tour for learning of its history, and also offers its residents various opportunities for recreation. There is an 18-hole golf course, and the Osawatomie City Lake for fishing. The USD 367 Sport and Fitness Zone (O-Zone) is also in Osawatomie, which has two indoor pools, an outdoor pool, a gymnasium, weight room, indoor track, and offers programs for all ages. The Karl E. Cole Sports Complex in Osawatomie is used for athletic events such as baseball, softball, soccer, and youth football.

Osawatomie hosts the John Brown Jamboree, an annual arts, crafts, and music festival each summer. Each October, the Talking Tombstones event is held at Oakwood Cemetery, with reenactments of historical figures buried there, to remember their lives and contribution to the community's history.

Government
The Osawatomie government consists of a mayor and eight council members.

Education
Four schools comprise the Osawatomie USD 367.
 Swenson Early Childhood Education Center (Pre-K and K)
 Trojan Elementary (grades 1-5)
 Osawatomie Middle School (grades 6-8)
 Osawatomie High School (grades 9-12)
On the 2009 Kansas State Assessments, Osawatomie High School achieved building wide Standard of Excellence Awards in both reading and math. The Osawatomie Middle School achieved a building wide Standard of Excellence Award in reading.

Faculty of USD #367 have received the Kansas Master Teacher of the Year three times, Kansas Teacher of the Year twice, and have also received once each the Kansas Reading Teacher of the Year, Kansas Social Studies Teacher of the Year, and Kansas Counselor of the Year.

Notable people
  John Brown resided for 20 months in a cabin, now the John Brown Museum
 Lynn Dickey - pro football player
 Derrick Jensen - pro football player
 Lafayette Russell - pro football player and actor

References

Further reading

External links

 City of Osawatomie
 Osawatomie - Directory of Public Officials
 Osawatomie city map, KDOT

Cities in Miami County, Kansas
Cities in Kansas
Populated places established in 1854
1854 establishments in Kansas Territory